Post is the second studio album by Icelandic singer Björk. It was released on 7 June 1995 by One Little Indian Records. Continuing the style developed on her first album Debut (1993), Bjork conceived of Post as a bolder and more extroverted set of songs than its predecessor, featuring an eclectic mixture of electronic and dance styles such as techno, trip hop, IDM, and house, but also ambient, jazz, industrial, and experimental music. Björk produced Post herself with co-producers including Nellee Hooper, 808 State's Graham Massey, and former Massive Attack member Tricky. She wrote most of the songs after moving to London, and intended the album to reflect her new life in the city.

The album reached number one in Iceland, number two in the United Kingdom and number 32 in the United States. It was certified gold in New Zealand and Sweden, and platinum in Australia, Canada, the US, and the UK. Six singles were released: "Army of Me", "Isobel", "It's Oh So Quiet", "Hyperballad", "Possibly Maybe", and "I Miss You", with three reaching the UK top 10. Their accompanying music videos were noted for their surrealism, themes of nature and technology, and artistic development of the medium. A remix album titled Telegram was released in 1996.

During the album's commercial peak, Björk was affected by media attention and Post's promotional tour. She survived a murder attempt, and caused controversy by assaulting a reporter. Björk would relocate to Spain away from the press and produce her next album, Homogenic (1997). Considered an important exponent of art pop, Post has been praised by critics for its ambition and timelessness. It was named one of the greatest albums of 1995 by numerous publications, and has since been named one of the greatest albums of all time by publications including Entertainment Weekly and Rolling Stone.

Recording and production

Björk released her previous studio album Debut in 1993. At that time, she had moved to London. The production of Debut was "long and laborious", as Björk sought to fully realise her compositional ideas from the past. After its release, she was free to concentrate on her present life for new musical clues for her following album. She contacted producer Nellee Hooper who had worked with her on her previous album. He refused initially, encouraging her to produce the album herself, but agreed when she insisted. However, Björk agreed to co-produce along with other enlisted producers; "to make it stay fresh, she had to think about other people being involved". With Hooper's confirmation, Björk commenced work on the album in late 1994 at the Compass Point Studios in Nassau. The picturesque locale inspired Björk to meld the recording process with the exotic natural environment. Biographer Mark Pytlik writes: "The tales surrounding these recording sessions are appropriately evocative". For example, Rolling Stone wrote that for her vocals: "Björk extended her mic cord to a beach so she could sing to the sea". Additionally, the first version of "Cover Me" was recorded entirely from a nearby cave.

For this record, Björk incorporated shelved songs she wrote in Manchester with 808 State's Graham Massey, which had preceded the recording sessions for Debut. These included "Army of Me" and "The Modern Things", which had become live staples over the summer, and did not need to undergo extensive transformations at Compass Point. Björk explained her decision to include "Army of Me" in Post rather than Debut: "I was gonna make it as a part of Debut but for me [that album] was a more gentle energy and Post was more raw, more brutal. And maybe you can say that Debut was London but Post was more a little bit Manchester, a little bit Scotland, a little bit Bristol. So it was not so sleek. At that time, anything that came from London was a little bit sleek, and people from Scotland and Manchester and Bristol looked down at all things sleek, they wanted things to be raw. When I use the word 'sleek' I actually don't use it as a bad word, I think it worked really well on Debut, to kinda glue everything together. But I think on Post I was like: 'okay, I've put aside this raw energy, now I want to bring it in." Massey stated: "With 'Army of Me' we wanted to try something that was quite hard and techno-y. I'm not sure how she wrote those lyrics so fast but I remember that song being almost instantaneous. [...] We kind of knocked that off in one day and then started on 'The Modern Things' the same day and finished that the next". 

Although the album was supposed to be delivered the day after she returned from the Bahamas, Björk felt it was not yet complete and decided to continue its production back in London. She enlisted a new team of engineers and programmers, and spent the next months "tweaking, rearranging, and sometimes completely rerecording her pre-existing tracks". Ultimately, it was the inclusion of more "real" instruments that "resuscitated Post for Björk". Björk continued to compose songs such as "Isobel", which was created while she was visiting Reykjavík for Christmas, before bringing it back to Hooper's studio. The song's lyrics were written in collaboration with Icelandic poet Sjón, which was his first songwriting experience. Sjón would become a frequent collaborator throughout Björk's career. She also enlisted trip hop artist Tricky to assist in producing the album, on the condition that he would work on two tracks on her album and she would contribute two vocals for his album. Their collaboration resulted in the Post songs "Enjoy" and "Headphones"—in addition to "Keep Your Mouth Shut" and "Yoga", which appeared on Tricky's 1996 studio album, Nearly God.

The track that underwent the most extensive change was "I Miss You", an old song from the Debut era. Howie Bernstein gave the song its "Latin-tinged [rhythm]". Back in London, Björk contacted "old standby" Talvin Singh to record additional percussion parts for it. Fellow former Sugarcubes member Einar Örn Benediktsson was also contacted to play the trumpet on "Enjoy". English sessionist Gary Barnacle was enlisted to play the saxophone. Although he had not been involved in music for a long time, Brazilian composer Eumir Deodato immediately agreed to participate on the album at Björk's request. Björk decided to contact him after being impressed by his arrangements of a rare Milton Nascimento song called "Travessia". Deodato's presence as composer and conductor "immediately bolstered" "Hyperballad", "You've Been Flirting Again" and "Isobel". This addition of strings, brass and percussion elements gave Post the balance Björk felt her original recordings had lacked. "It's Oh So Quiet" was the last track to be recorded. By the time the album was finished in April 1995, the list of co-producers included Björk, Hooper, Bernstein, Massey, and Tricky. Björk has said: "The people I collaborated with were all people I was hanging out with in clubs in London. I had known them all for a while before we ended up working together."

Composition

Musical style

Björk's website described Post as "a bit of a bolder side of [Björk], who now had ventured all the way from Iceland to England, and was exploring the faster pace and big city life that this new country brought. This album became influenced of that and became more adventurous and club-friendly as a contrast to the shy first album, Debut." Likewise, The Guardian wrote in 2011 that "Post tapped into the vortex of multicultural energy that was mid-90s London where she had relocated, and where strange hybrids such as jungle and trip-hop were bubbling". Noted for its eclectic nature, Björk described Post as "musically promiscuous" and "spastic". Peter Tabakis of Pretty Much Amazing said that it has a protean form and "wide emotional palette". While the album is recognised as an experimental work, it is also characterised by its accessibility and pop framework. Post has been described as art pop, experimental pop, and avant-pop.

Post touches on various musical styles, including industrial music, big-band jazz, trip hop, chillout, and experimental music. Jim Farber, reviewing the album in 1995 for Entertainment Weekly, considered Post to be a "connecting point between industrial-disco, ambient-trance, and catchy synth pop". When asked if this variety of genres was intentional, Björk replied: "Yes, I'm very aware of that. I've got very many sides to me." She recognises Post as darker and more aggressive than Debut, and has identified independence, strength, and instinct as its lyrical themes. The balance between synthetic and organic elements in the album—generated through the combination of electronic and "real" instruments—is a recurring characteristic of Björk's output. In 1999, Vibe stated: "Fusing techno, industrial, ambient, punk, and the rarefied yet tuneful spheres of art rock, Björk explores a jungle of tones, supported by her eternally buoyant voice from Mars." Part of the album's innovation was Björk's further embrace of electronic instrumentation, an interest established on Debut. While IDM and trip hop influences were present on Debut, Post is characterised by Björk's fuller incorporation of these genres.

The Rolling Stone review stated that Björk "[foraged] for inspiration in the soundscapes of orchestral jazz, ambient techno and classical". Influences of jazz fusion were also noted by a contemporary review by The New York Times. In 1996, when asked about the album's musical influences, Björk stated: "I'm influenced by everything. By books, by the weather, by the water, by my shoes, if they're comfortable or not. Everything."

Songs

The album opens with "Army of Me", an aggressive song with industrial rock, and trip hop influences. It incorporates a looped drum sample of Led Zeppelin's "When the Levee Breaks". Dedicated to Björk's younger brother, the song's lyrics are, according to Björk herself, "about telling someone who is full of self-pity and doesn't have anything together to get a life and stand up"; as she sings: "And if you complain once more/You'll meet an army of me!" "Hyperballad", which incorporates a spectrum of electronic and orchestral styles, has been described as "a love song penned by Aphex Twin". NME wrote that its music "altered from gentle folktronica to drum and bass-tinted acid house"; an attempt to reflect the song's lyrics, which are about "the art of not forgetting about yourself". In them, Björk describes living at the top of a mountain and going to a cliff at sunrise. She throws objects off the cliff while pondering her own suicide. The ritual allows her to exorcise darker thoughts and return to her partner. The track is followed by "The Modern Things", a song that, in a magical realist tone, "playfully posits the theory that technology has always existed, waiting in mountains for humans to catch up". Interview described it in 1995 as a "spooky tune", noting "the odd scratchings at the end" of the track. In a startling shift in style, the big band track "It's Oh So Quiet" covers a German composition made famous by Betty Hutton. It has been described as "a palate-cleanser during the course of the record". Björk included the song "just to make it absolutely certain that the album would be as schizophrenic as possible, that every song would be a shock".

The following track, "Enjoy", a song concerning the links between sex and fear, has been considered "decidedly trippy", and "Posts most abrasive track". NME described it in its 1995 review as, "a dark and deranged techno thing". Over military drums and "squalls of noise", Björk sings about "her hedonistic tendencies". The orchestral interlude "You've Been Flirting Again", like the previous track "Enjoy", features "mysterious or open-ended lyrics". They are an attempt to describe the ambiguous nature of flirting. "Isobel" is a string-laden, orchestral trip hop song, Craig McLean of The Face called the track "Broadway on breakbeats". Conceived by Björk as "part autobiography part storytelling", its lyrics concern Isobel, a woman magically born in a forest who finds people in the city "a bit too clever for her", eventually retreating back to nature and sending them a message of instinct through trained moths. Inspired by South American literature—particularly Gabriel García Márquez—the track's lyrics discuss "the duality between reason and emotions, between intuition and intellect"; in Björk's words, "asking how 20th century civilisation clashes with nature and, in places like Iceland and Thailand, people really believe they can have a TV remote control in one hand and a ghost sitting beside them".

"Possibly Maybe" is an ambient dub track that fuses trip-hop and chill-out music. Björk has said that it was the first unhappy song she wrote, stating in 1997: "That was very hard for me. [...] I was ashamed writing a song that was not giving hope". Its lyrics document the various stages of Björk's ill-fated relationship with Stéphane Sednaoui. With the track, De Vries "create[d] a vinyl-crackling ambience, full of glissando strings and leaden, muted bass. The slide guitar heard in the background of the song was originally intended to be its focal point, as Björk initially strived for an "ambient country" sound inspired by Chris Isaak's "Wicked Game".  "I Miss You" was described in 1997 as an "amalgam of styles, with electronic drums melding into African bongos mixed with jazzy horn playing". A house music number, its "horn-infused Afro-Cuban strains [...] reflect the romantic whimsy of [its] lyrics". Björk wrote "Cover Me", one of the quieter moments on the album, to her co-producer Nellee Hooper after he agreed to participate in the making of Post. She has said: "I guess I was trying to make fun of myself, how dangerous I manage sometimes to make album making. And trying to lure him into it. But it is also  thing from me to him". The album ends with the experimental "Headphones", an ambient track. Featuring "just-for-headphones studio tricks", it has been described as "a chiming, somnolent dip into Björk's heavy-lidded pre-dream state". Its lyrics were written as a thank you to Graham Massey, who would make compilation cassettes for Björk. She also stated: "But, of course, it is also a love letter to sound. The sound of sound. Resonances, frequencies, silences and such... a music-worship thing".

Title and artwork
[[File:Piccadilly Circus - geograph.org.uk - 265001.jpg|thumb|upright=1.3|Post'''s album cover was meant to depict Björk in Piccadilly Circus.]]
Björk chose the title Post for two reasons. Firstly, it refers to the fact that all the songs on the album were written after her move to England, while the songs on Debut were songs she had written during the previous ten years of her life in Iceland. In a 1996 interview, Björk said: "I always knew it would be two albums and that's why I called them Debut and Post. Before and after". Secondly, the title was inspired by Björk's desire to communicate with friends and family back in Iceland, giving Post the additional meaning of "mail".

The album cover was photographed by Stephane Sednaoui. It shows Björk standing in a London street, her pale skin and dark hair contrasting with the vivid colours of the Japanese-inspired signs behind her. Designer Paul White of Me Company—who had been a frequent collaborator since the Sugarcubes—"surrounded her with giant postcards to represent communication with friends and family". Björk also said that "my musical heart was scattered at the time and I wanted the [cover] to show that". Me Company designed the artwork, while Martin Gardiner modeled the lotus flower used in the album's booklet and packaging. The jacket Björk wears, shown on the cover, was inspired by Royal Mail airmail envelopes, referencing the album's title. It was specially crafted from envelope paper called Tyvek by designer Hussein Chalayan. The jacket is displayed under glass at Hard Rock Reykjavík, and was part of a 2015 MoMA retrospective on Björk, Björk. Vice has identified the airmail jacket look as one of the "ultimate fashion moments" of Björk's career.

A shot of Björk surrounded by silver balls was planned as the cover, but it was scrapped in favour of something "more poppy". The photo would later appear in a 1995 article for The Face.

Release and promotionPost was released on 7 June 1995, as a 12" record, CD, and compact cassette. It was issued on One Little Indian Records in the United Kingdom and Elektra Records in the United States and Canada; Polydor Records issued Post in Australia and Japan, also releasing the European edition of the album. In September 1995, Björk and poet Sjón released Post, a paperback book meant to be a "pictorial and verbal record of the making of that album". It contained interviews with Björk and also focused on the European leg of the tour. The Post Tour was her first proper North American tour as a solo artist, with Aphex Twin as her opening act. While in the United States, she also appeared on Late Night with David Letterman; this tour "helped maintain Posts momentum and keep Björk in the public eye", since airings of "Army of Me" and "Isobel" had been relegated primarily to after-hours alternative music shows in MTV. In the United Kingdom, Björk also performed on Top of the Pops on several occasions. In 1996, Björk took part in Arnold Schoenberg's Pierrot lunaire, conducted by Kent Nagano and the Opera orchestra of Lyon. In addition, Björk also appeared in several music magazines.

In November 1996, Björk released the "often-delayed" remix project Telegram, which contained reworkings of several songs from Post, with her voice re-recorded. Telegram has been described as "effectively a completely new album". Author Mark Pytlik writes, "Promises of a Post remix album had been circulating since the release of "Army of Me" in April 1995. To compensate, Björk announced the release of a string of 12″ remixes beginning in June, limited to only 1,000 copies each. Producers and musicians featured on Telegram include: Dillinja, Eumir Deodato, LFO, and Graham Massey, among others; Björk only remixed "You've Been Flirting Again" herself. The album also contains a new composition, "My Spine", a collaboration with British percussionist Evelyn Glennie. Telegram spent five weeks on the US Billboard 200 chart, peaking at number 66. In the UK, it peaked at number 59, spending two weeks on the albums chart.

In 2005, the UNICEF charity record Army of Me: Remixes and Covers was released; it is a collection of seventeen eclectic remixes of "Army of Me". All profits went directly to the charity, to assist the victims of the 2004 Indian Ocean earthquake and tsunami. Live at Shepherds Bush Empire was released as a VHS in November 1998, containing the last performance of the Post Tour, which took place at Shepherd's Bush Empire in February 1997. Post Live, a live album consisting of songs recorded during the Post Tour, was included in the 2003 box set Live Box. The 2002 box set Family Tree includes demos and alternate versions of various tracks off the album. Post has been reissued several times, adapting to different formats such as colored records, 180g vinyl, and DualDisc. A remastered version of the album in surround sound was included in the box set Surrounded, which was released in 2006 on Elektra Records. In 2012, Universal Japan issued a limited edition of Debut and Post together as one compilation . All of Posts music videos were included on the 1998 video release Volumen, and its 2002 reissue Volumen Plus. They also appear on Greatest Hits – Volumen 1993–2003, a release that includes the videos featured on Volumen and Volumen Plus. They are also featured on video compilations of its directors, including The Work of Director Michel Gondry and The Work of Director Spike Jonze, all of them from 2003.

Singles

"Army of Me" was released as the lead single from Post on 24 April 1995, shortly after the album's production concluded. It was released in the United Kingdom as two different CD releases, with "Cover Me", "You've Been Flirting Again", "Sweet Intuition", and various remixes as its B-sides. A commercial success, it peaked atop the Íslenski Listinn Topp 40, as well as at numbers five and ten in Finland and the United Kingdom, respectively. In the United States, it peaked at number 21 on the Alternative Airplay chart. Michel Gondry directed the video for "Army of Me", which takes place in a cyberpunk environment. In the video, Björk is seen driving a massive truck, which has been described as "alternately [looking] like an overgrown SUV and a science fiction tank" as she quests to rescue her loved one from an art museum.

"Isobel" was released as the second single on 7 August, with B-sides "Charlene", "I Go Humble", "Venus as a Boy", and several remixes. Although the record company was against the idea of releasing "Isobel", Björk insisted because she "felt intuitively that this was the right choice". However, "Isobel" did not replicate the success of "Army of Me", peaking at number two in Iceland and number 23 in the UK. The music video for "Isobel", directed by Gondry "Isobel" represents the story of the title character Björk envisioned with Sjón. It tells the story of "a wild child discovering urban culture through installations of toy fighter planes", over lush superimposed imagery. Like in the lyrics, where Björk takes the role of narrator and protagonist, she plays two different parts in the music video: Björk is seen as the Isobel who "weaves and composes this world and this story on her organ", and as the Isobel who inhabits this primal world.

"It's Oh So Quiet" was released as the third single on 13 November. Its B-sides included "You've Been Flirting Again", "Hyperballad", "Sweet Sweet Intuition" (a rework of "Sweet Intuition"), and "My Spine". The music video for "It's Oh So Quiet" became one of the most played clips on MTV, and the song became Björk's most successful single, peaking at number one in Iceland and within the top ten in Australia, Finland, Ireland, Scotland and the UK, while peaking at number nine on the US Billboard Hot 100's extension Bubbling Under Hot 100 chart. The single was certified gold by the British Phonographic Industry (BPI) for shipments of 400,000 units in the UK. Spike Jonze directed the music video for "It's Oh So Quiet", a homage to Hollywood's Technicolor musicals that drew inspiration from Busby Berkeley and Jacques Demy's The Umbrellas of Cherbourg. Like Demy, Jonze "mines the magical from the mundane," as he transforms a drab auto shop into the location where Björk dances and sings with a full dance company, an attempt to reflect the "exuberance" of her vocal performance.

"Hyperballad" was released as the fourth single on 12 February 1996. The single—consisting of two separate CDs—also included remixes of the song, "Isobel" and "Cover Me". Some regions also included a double A-side single with the song "Enjoy", although it only received a number of promo remixes. It peaked at number eight on the UK Singles Chart and atop the US Dance Club Songs. The music video for "Hyperballad", also directed by Gondry, has been described as "a techno-dream visual story full of flashing lights, buzzing static, and holograms." It shows Björk as "a character running through a landscape that simulates that of a computer game, only to throw herself off a cliff." The clip is an attempt to reflect the song's story, so Gondry depicted Björk lying down as a dead body, with a holographic image of her singing superimposed on her.

"Possibly Maybe" was released as the fifth single on 28 October via several 12-inch records and three different CD releases. A limited-edition 12-inch double A-side with remixes of "Possibly Maybe" and "Enjoy" (by Mark Bell and Dom T., respectively) was also released. "Possibly Maybe" peaked at number 13 on the UK Singles Chart. Sednaoui directed the music video for "Possibly Maybe", despite the song being about his failed relationship with Björk. Björk and Sednaoui had previously worked together in the music video for "Big Time Sensuality". In the clip, she appears "as a goddess, floating out from a numinous light-streaked background." Sednaoui is known for having a particularly filmic technique for each of his clips; in "Possibly Maybe", the use of blacklighting "makes Björk glow sensuously and perversely". It was conceived in a theatrical way: nearly all of the scenes were filmed in the same space, which is transformed with changes in the mise-en-scène. The style of "Possibly Maybe"'s scenery and Björk's wardrobe reference East Asian imagery, and a Japanese traditional doll is featured as Björk's only accompaniment; as a silent witness, it is the object on which the protagonist casts reflections on her own identity. Regarding the video, Sednaoui said: "Her song and my video were a way of saying things to each other that we couldn't say otherwise."

"I Miss You" was released as the sixth and final single on 17 February 1997.  Although it became Björk's third US Dance Club Songs number-one single, it was the least successful single from Post in Europe, as it peaked only at number 36 on the UK Singles Chart. The animation of its music video was produced by John Kricfalusi and directed by Erik Weiss. It was promptly censored on MTV because of its nudity and violence towards the end.

Critical reception

Upon its release, Post received universal acclaim from music critics. Lorraine Ali of Rolling Stone praised the album for differentiating from the alternative rock offerings of the early 1990s, and for successfully merging disparate styles. She concluded: "When Post comes to an end, it feels like getting back from a good vacation: the last thing you want to do is re-enter the real world". Writing for Entertainment Weekly, Jim Farber stated that despite Posts "bizarre" combination of diverse genres, the conviction of Björk's delivery and assuring hooks "[made] her most surreal passages as relatable as moon-June standards". He felt that Björk "[reinvented] that tradition, constructing standards for the cyber age".

Joy Press, who reviewed the album for The New York Times, praised the album for not being a "play-safe sequel" to Debut, pointing out that Björk, "[had] followed her most wonderfully wayward impulses". Los Angeles Times critic Richard Cromelin felt that Post was "an often heady mix of trendiness and nostalgia" that was capable of transcending Björk's self-consciousness. Greg Kot of the Chicago Tribune found the album's backing tracks to be "even more varied and unusual" than on Debut, describing Björk as "an extra-terrestrial voice rummaging around in a sonic toybox". Spins Barry Walters felt the album was an improvement over its predecessor, stating its songs were "stronger, more developed, and less reliant on Björk's wide-eyed delivery". He concluded that: "After years of (no) alternative fascist grunge domination, it's heartening that Björk and producer-co-songwriter Nellee Hooper stayed true to themselves and created another highly personal album that has a chance of interrupting the airwave flow of whiny rockers with little imagination".

Writing for MTV Online, Lou Stathis wrote that, "[it's mostly] Björk's wacky, mind-altered perspective that makes Post modern pop music at once both baffling and engaging". He believed that the album was a rewarding experience for both the casual consumer, as well as the serious listener, also pointing out that, "it not only sounds good while you're listening to it, but it leaves you feeling good when it's over, too". Robert Christgau, reviewing the album for The Village Voice, was less enthusiastic. He found that the album's "eccentric instrumentation" and "electronic timbres" failed to compensate for its lack of "groove" and was unmoved by Björk's lyrics, which he said "might hit home harder if she'd grown up speaking the English she'll die singing, but probably wouldn't".

Commercial performancePost reached the top ten of several countries, including Australia, Belgium, Canada, Denmark, the Netherlands, Finland, France, Germany, Ireland, New Zealand, Norway, Portugal, Sweden, Switzerland, and the United Kingdom. Post also peaked at number two on the European Top 100 Albums chart. The album peaked at number 32 in the Billboard 200, almost 30 places higher than the peak position of its predecessor Debut. It also received an enthuastic reception from college radios. Post also reached top 40 in Hungary and Japan. The album was certified platinum in Australia, Canada, the United Kingdom, the United States, and Europe; and gold in Sweden and New Zealand. In 2007, The Washington Post reported that Post had sold 810,000 units in the United States according to Nielsen SoundScan; it had sold 36,000 additional copies by 2015.

Controversy
The music video for "Army of Me" was removed from MTV's playlist before it aired because its ending depicted Björk bombing an art museum; the Oklahoma City bombing happened at this time. Author Mark Pytlik wrote that this "foreshadowed a string of unlucky events that would further hinder Posts unveiling".

An unsourced sample by Robin Rimbaud, prominently heard throughout "Possibly Maybe", resulted in a lawsuit demanding a co-songwriter credit. After Rimbaud's label New Electronica refused a sample clearance compensation of £1,000 from One Little Indian founder Derek Birkett, Björk and Birkett resolved to destroy over 100,000 copies of the album to create a new version without the sample. However, at the request of Rimbaud, New Electronica gave Björk permission use the sample.

Musician Simon Fisher sued Hooper and Björk over writing credits in Debut (1993), but these charges were cleared by judge Robin Jacob. According to Pytlik, these events resulted in "the strangest promotional tour anyone could have ever envisioned: in the week since Post had been released, Björk had seen her album deleted, her video banned, and two separate lawsuits brought against her". One Little Indian were also better prepared to promote the album, scheduling a string of European and American tour dates from the beginning of July into late August.

During the Post era, the extensive media attention and a world tour of 105 dates began to affect Björk. She repeatedly complained about the intrusiveness of tabloids and reporters. On tour in February 1996, Björk arrived at Bangkok International Airport with her son Sindri after a long flight. While the pair walked through the arrival terminals, reporter Julie Kaufman approached them and said, "Welcome to Bangkok!" Björk charged at Kaufman and wrestled her to the ground. It was later reported Kaufman had been bothering Björk and Sindri for days prior. The incident was reported around the world.

On 12 September, an obsessed American fan, Ricardo López, sent a letter bomb rigged with sulfuric acid to Björk's residence in London, returned home and filmed his suicide. Police contacted Scotland Yard, who intercepted the package without incident. To record in privacy away from the unwanted interest of the press, Björk's tour drummer Trevor Morais offered her his studio in Málaga, Spain, to record her next album, Homogenic.

Impact and legacy

Nick Coleman of The Independent considered Post to be an important release of the art pop genre, Retrospectively, Slant Magazines Eric Henderson argued that Post "will likely always remain the Björk album that most successfully sustains her winning balance of experimental whimsy and solid pop magic", while Heather Phares of AllMusic wrote that the record was "not simply Debut redux" and concluded: "The work of a constantly changing artist, Post proves that as Björk moves toward more ambitious, complex music, she always surpasses herself". Celebrating the album's 20th anniversary, the British magazine NME described it as, "a masterful matching of hard, up-to-the-minute beats with complex, personal lyrics about the rush and rage of being a modern urban woman". American writer Tom Moon included Post in his 2008 reference book 1,000 Recordings to Hear Before You Die.

The album's influence has been identified as being increasingly palpable on the contemporary music landscape, and later reviews of the album also make note of the timeless aspect of the music. Writing for The Daily Review, James Rose wrote in 2015: "Post is where mainstream music could have gone. While modern chart music hasn't gone there entirely[,] she undoubtedly helped broaden the playing field. [The album] stands today as a body of work that still informs the more marginal artistic fringes of modern music and reminds us how narrow and staid our world would be without outliers like Björk. Also in 2015, Andrew Shaw of Nerdist felt that Post "chose to ignore expectation, market restrictions, and contemporary trends", and that Björk "pushed her vocal performances into new places, where no other vocalists could dare to sing". He compared the album's impact on audiences to that of Jimi Hendrix's 1967 album, Are You Experienced, writing it "set the benchmark for what was possible when you take tradition and set it on fire". Raymond Ang of The Wall Street Journal considered Post to be "Björk's last stab at the pop game… she would dig deeper into her increasingly avant-garde interests and, in the years to come, thrill and challenge her audience".

David Longstreth of Dirty Projectors is an admirer of the record, stating he was influenced by Björk's deconstruction of classic melodies. American singer-songwriter Amy Lee has said Post is "one of the biggest records in [her] life". DJ Shadow sampled "Possibly Maybe" in "Mutual Slump", a track off his 1996 album, Endtroducing...... The Vitamin String Quartet—known for its series of tribute albums to rock and pop acts—covered "Army of Me" and "You've Been Flirting Again" in the 2001 album, Ice: The String Tribute to Björk. In 2008, Stereogum released a compilation of cover versions in homage to the album, titled Enjoyed: A Tribute to Björk's Post. It features: Dirty Projectors, Liars, Xiu Xiu, High Places and Atlas Sound, among other artists.

Much of Post's six music videos have gone on to become classics—most notably "It's Oh So Quiet" and "Army of Me". At the time of its release, music videos were beginning to be used as an art form, and Björk's visual output during this period—and her career in general—have become a clear example of the medium's artistic legitimation. Spanish writer Estíbaliz Pérez Asperilla has identified recurring motifs and themes through Björk's videography; these include nature and a magnified depiction of Björk. Surrealism and technology have also been identified as recurring features in Björk's visual output of this period. David Ehrlich of Time Out considered her "one of the first artists to meaningfully explore the aesthetic and semiotic value of CG and its relationship to the [videos]." Writing for Paste, Alexa Carrasco felt, "Björk has created some of the most beautiful and weird videos to ever play on MTV."  The popularity of the music video for "It's Oh So Quiet" made the song one of Björk's most ubiquitous tracks, and was considered her first breakthrough on MTV. The music videos—and the pink boots Björk wears in "Hyperballad" (the work of Belgian designer Walter Van Beirendonck)—were displayed in the Museum of Modern Art, New York City, as part of the 2015 Björk exhibition. They were also featured in the 2016 exhibition, Björk Digital, which premiered at Carriageworks as part of the Vivid Sydney festival.

In 2008, when asked how she felt about the album in retrospect, Björk reflected: "I was kinda surprised how the odd spastic thing of the album had actually aged well."

Accolades
By the end of 1995, Post appeared on the year-end lists of several publications. In The Village Voices Pazz & Jop critics' poll for 1995, the album placed at number seven. At the 1995 Icelandic Music Awards, Post received the award for Album of the Year; Björk was also awarded Artist of the Year, Female Singer of the Year, Composer of the Year, and was nominated for Songwriter of the Year. Additionally, "Army of Me" received the Song of the Year award, with "Isobel" also being nominated. She also received the Best Female award at the 1995 MTV Europe Music Awards,
 and Best International Female at the Rockbjörnen Awards. Björk was also nominated for the Nordic Council Music Prize. In 1996, she received her second Best International Female Solo Artist award at the 16th Brit Awards. She received the same distinction at the Danish Music Awards, the International Dance Music Awards, and the Italian Music Prize. In 1996, Post was nominated for Best Alternative Music Album at the 38th Annual Grammy Awards, was awarded an IFPI Platinum Europe Award, and the ASCAP Vanguard Award given by the American Society of Composers, Authors and Publishers. For the album's music videos, "Army of Me" was nominated for Best Special Effects in a Video and the International Viewer's Choice Award at the 1995 MTV Video Music Awards. "It's Oh So Quiet" was nominated for the Best Music Video award at the 38th Annual Grammy Awards, losing to Janet and Michael Jackson's "Scream". At the 1996 MTV Video Music Awards, the video was awarded the Best Choreography in a Video award, and was nominated for Best Female Video, Breakthrough Video, Best Direction, Best Art Direction in a Video, and International Viewer's Choice Award (MTV Europe).Vibe included the album in its 1999 list of the 100 Essential Albums of the 20th Century. Slant Magazine considered it the second best album of the decade in a 2011 list, only behind Björk's next release, Homogenic, writing it: "is [her] most scatterbrained work to date, but it's tied together flawlessly by [Björk's] singular whimsicality". In 2003, Pitchfork listed it as the 20th best album of the decade, with William Morris writing, "few artists on this list could rival [Björk] in terms of innovation, vision, talent, and high-yield experimentation, and Post was the record to establish this." In a 2012 article, Paste considered Post to be the sixty-fourth best album of the decade, with Ryan Reed stating: "no Björk album is as weird (or weirdly wonderful) as 1995's Post, a dizzying whirlwind of sonic textures and stylistic shifts that demonstrates every facet of her ever-expanding bag of tricks. [...] Björk clearly aimed to demonstrate the meaninglessness of genre boundaries. She succeeded." Post was ranked at number 376 on Rolling Stone's "500 Greatest Albums of All Time" list, with the publication praising its "utter lack of musical inhibition," and ranked at number 289 on the 2020 updated list. The American publication Consequence of Sound placed the album at number seventy-nine on their 2010 list of the Top 100 Albums Ever, with Harry Painter writing: "Björk is one of few artists who could put out an album juxtaposing blistering electro-pop with big band, club-ready tribal dance with downtempo trip-hop and find both critical and commercial success." In 2015, Post placed on number 69 on Spins list of the 300 Best Albums of the Past 30 Years, claiming that "[Björk's] fearless plunge into styles is matched by the aplomb with which she bares her anxieties and aspirations."  Also in 2008, FNAC placed the album at number 246 in its list of the 1000 best albums of all time. In an unordered list of 500 essential albums compiled for Vanity Fair in 2013, English musician Elvis Costello included Post and mentioned "Hyperballad" as a highlight of the record. In the album's entry of the "Women Who Rock: The 50 Greatest Albums of All Time" list of 2012, Rolling Stone felt, "Björk's artistic stature grew by yards in the course of this strange, affecting work, by turns harshly industrial, meditative and neon jubilant."

Track listing

 "Army of Me" contains a sample from "When the Levee Breaks" (1971), performed by Led Zeppelin.

 "Possibly Maybe" contains a sample from "Untitled (Side A)" (1994), performed by DJ Scanner. The sample was shortly removed from some early pressings of Post while it was disputed.

Personnel
Credits adapted from the liner notes of Post''.

Musicians

 Björk – vocals, arrangements, keyboards, organ, string arrangements, brass arrangements, beat programming
 Howie Bernstein – programming
 John Altman – orchestra arrangements, conducting
 Marcus Dravs – programming
 Lenny Franchi – programming
 Graham Massey – keyboards, programming
 Tricky – keyboards, programming
 Marius de Vries – keyboards, programming
 Gary Barnacle – soprano saxophone
 Stuart Brooks – trumpet
 Jim Couza – hammer dulcimer
 Einar Örn Benediktsson – trumpet
 Eumir Deodato – string arrangements, conducting
 Isobel Griffiths – orchestral contracting
 Maurice Murphy – trumpet
 Tony Pleeth – cello
 Guy Sigsworth – harpsichord
 Talvin Singh – percussion
 Rob Smissen – viola
 Gavin Wright – orchestra leading

Technical personnel

 Björk – production
 Howie Bernstein – production, engineering, mixing
 Marcus Dravs – engineering, mixing
 Al Fisch – engineering
 Lenny Franchi – engineering
 Nellee Hooper – production
 Graham Massey – production
 Steve Price – engineering
 Mark "Spike" Stent – mixing
 Al Stone – engineering
 Tricky – production

Artwork

 Martin Gardiner – lotus flower modelling
 Me Company – artwork packaging design
 Stéphane Sednaoui – photography

Charts

Weekly charts

Year-end charts

Certifications and sales

Release history

See also
Album era
Media studies
Music of the United Kingdom (1990s)
Postmodern art

Notes

References

Bibliography

External links
 

1995 albums
Albums produced by Howie B
Albums produced by Nellee Hooper
Björk albums
One Little Independent Records albums
Albums produced by Björk
Albums recorded at Olympic Sound Studios
Avant-pop albums
Experimental pop albums